Building Giants (ISSN 2455-6408) is an Indian quarterly magazine registered under Registrar of Newspapers for India in 2010. The magazine is published by ABS Publication, which is a part of ABS Group of companies based out of Indore in Central India. It primarily focuses on the emerging trends in architectural world. It is a magazine for architects and related professionals. Building Giants documents significant architecture and design from across the world and features articles on current practice, building technology, interior designs and social issues affecting architecture.

Building Giants issues are usually a mix of design ideas and trends, building science, business and professional strategies, exploration of key issues, new products and computer-aided practice architecture and design, new wave furniture designs and ideas.

History 

ABS group of companies is consisting of four companies, absIT focusing on software development; DesignLab International, for 3D rendering and visualisation, ABS Arch which provides architectural libraries and ABS Publication which publishes Building Giants. In the year 2015, Building Giants started inviting guest editors to publish a theme based magazine. Most of their guest editors are renowned architects, academicians and designers who suggest a theme for the issue.  According to Anis Qureshi (Editor-in-Chief), "The idea behind inviting a panel of guest editor is to showcase their architectural and design philosophy to readers, and provide an opportunity to publish the works of other leading architects and designers on the same theme."

Editors-in-chief 
 Anis P. Qureshi

Editors 
 Kanika Mehata
 Aniket Pradhan

Guest editors 
 Architect Habeeb Khan, Nagpur, India
 Architect Smita Khan, Nagpur, India
 Architect Massimiliano Fuksas, Paris, France
 Architect Doriana Fuksas, Paris, France
 Architect Sanjay Mohe, Bangalore, India
 Mr. Manish Kumat, Indore, India
 Architect. Manish Banker, Pune, India
 Architect. Sanjay Patil
 Architect. Bidisha Sinha

References 

 https://web.archive.org/web/20060110092202/http://rni.nic.in/display_title.asp

External links 
 

2010 establishments in Madhya Pradesh
Architecture magazines
Design magazines
Interior design
Magazines established in 2010
Mass media in Indore
Quarterly magazines published in India
English-language magazines published in India
Architecture in India